Pelobacter (gr pelos : mud) is a bacterial genus in the order Desulfuromonadales. The cells are rod-shaped with rounded ends and occur in single, pairs or chains. They have a fermentative metabolism.

References

 Martin Dworkin, Stanley Falkow, Eugene Rosenberg, Karl-Heinz Schleifer, Erko Stackebrandt (Hrsg.) The Prokaryotes, A Handbook of the Biology of Bacteria. Volume 7: Proteobacteria: Delta and Epsilon Subclasses. Deeply Rooting Bacteria

External links

Pelobacter J.P. Euzéby: List of Prokaryotic names with Standing in Nomenclature

Pelobacteraceae
Bacteria genera